The Philippines has participated at the World Games since its inception in 1981. It has won at least a medal in every edition of the World Games except the 1981 and 2005 editions. The first gold medal won for the nation was by cue sports player Carlo Biado who won the men's nine-ball singles event in the 2017 World Games. The first gold by a woman athlete is by Junna Tsukii in kumite 50kg division in the 2022 World Games.

Medal count

Ranking is based on total gold medals earned.

Medals by sport

Medalists
The first medals won by competitors for the Philippines at the World Games was obtained in the 1985 edition in London, United Kingdom. The medals consists of two silvers won by taekwondo athletes Arnold Baradi and Mike Ventossa and a bronze by ten-pin bowlers Olivia "Bong" Coo and Rene Reyes competing in the mixed doubles events. The Philippines has consistently won at least one medal in every edition except the 1981 and 2005 editions. 

It was only in the 2017 edition in Wroclaw, Poland, did the Philippines won its first gold medal. The medal was won by cue sports player, Carlo Biado in the men's single nine-ball event.

Source:World Games

References

 
Nations at the World Games